Space ethics are about the ethical implications of space flight. It involves contemporary issues such as protection of the space environment, particularly space debris mitigation, or the militarization of space. More theoretical issues are the ethics of space colonization or the ethics of terraforming. The issues are often discussed as elements of broader issues such as general environmental protection and imperialism.

References

See also
 Environmental ethics
 Ethics of technology

Ethics of science and technology
Space applications